Tombanu (also Romanized as Tombānū; also known as Tonbānū) is a village in Howmeh Rural District, in the Central District of Minab County, Hormozgan Province, Iran. At the 2006 census, its population was 815, in 149 families.

References 

Populated places in Minab County